Epinotia rubiginosana is a moth of the family Tortricidae. It is found from Europe to eastern Russia, China, Korea and Japan.

The wingspan is 13–15 mm. Adults are on wing from May to July.

The larvae of the nominate subspecies feed on Pinus sylvestris, Pinus pinea and also Abies species. Subspecies koraiensis can be found on Pinus koraiensis, Pinus densiflora, Pinus strobus and Pinus pumila. The larvae feed on spun needles.

Subspecies
Epinotia rubiginosana rubiginosana (Europe)
Epinotia rubiginosana koraiensis Falkovitsh, 1965 (eastern Asia)

References

External links
Eurasian Tortricidae

Moths described in 1851
Eucosmini
Moths of Japan
Moths of Europe